Claus Eftevaag (born 20 December 1969) is a retired Norwegian football defender.

Honours
Lierse SK
 Belgian Super Cup: 1997

References

1969 births
Living people
Sportspeople from Kristiansand
Norwegian footballers
IK Start players
SK Brann players
Lierse S.K. players
Association football defenders
Eliteserien players
Belgian Pro League players
Norwegian expatriate footballers
Expatriate footballers in Belgium
Norwegian expatriate sportspeople in Belgium
Norway youth international footballers
Norway under-21 international footballers
Norway international footballers